Haig Aram Bosmajian (March 26, 1928- June 17, 2014) was an author, lecturer, and professor, who received the 1983 Orwell Award for his book The Language of Oppression (1974). Haig Bosmajian received a PhD in 1960 from Stanford University. His work has explored rhetoric and the freedom of speech. Bosmajian was professor emeritus at the University of Washington, in the Speech/Communications Department, where he taught since 1965. He was married for 57 years to Hamida Bosmajian, also a published author and a professor at nearby Seattle University.

Haig and Hamida Bosmajian wrote the textbook, The Rhetoric of the Civil Rights Movement (1969), which has been published as a student textbook to analyze strategies of rhetoric.

Works
Selected works by Haig Bosmajian include:
 Anita Whitney, Louis Brandeis, and the First Amendment
 Burning Books (March 2006, 233 pages) .
 The Freedom Not to Speak (New York, 1999, 248p.) .
 Metaphor and Reason in Judicial Opinions (July 1992)
 The Freedom to Publish (New York: Neal-Schuman, 1989, 230p.)
 The Freedom of Religion (First Amendment in the Classroom) (June 1987)
 Freedom to Read (April 1987)
 Censorship, Libraries, and the Law (1983)
 The Language of Oppression (1974)
 The Principles and Practice of Freedom of Speech (1971)
 Dissent, Symbolic Behavior and Rhetorical Strategies
 Readings in speech (1965)
 "The Communist Manifesto: Critical Essay"
 "Lying to the People", Western Journal of Speech Communication, Fall 1991.
 "Dehumanizing People and Euphemizing War", Christian Century, December 5, 1984.

Notes

References
 "Haig Bosmajian", September 1999, Shefman.com, webpage: Sheftman-Basma.

External links
 "Dehumanizing People and Euphemizing War" (essay), Haig Bosmajian, Christian Century, December 5, 1984, p. 1147.
 "The Freedom Not to Speak - Google Books Result", Google Books, webpage: Books-Google-FNS-front.

American male writers
American people of Armenian descent
2014 deaths
Stanford University alumni
University of Washington faculty
1928 births